Aggressive is the second studio album by American hardcore punk band Beartooth. It was released on June 3, 2016 through Red Bull Records and UNFD. The single "Aggressive" was released on April 22, 2016 along with the pre-order for the album.

On December 18, 2020 the band re-released the album with an entirely new mix and master done by Caleb Shomo on streaming and vinyl.

Track listing
All tracks written by Caleb Shomo unless specified otherwise.

Personnel
Beartooth
 Caleb Shomo – vocals, all instruments

Production
 Caleb Shomo – production, engineering, mixing (re-release only)
 David Bendeth – mixing
 Ted Jensen – mastering
 Koby Nelson – mix recording engineering, digital editing
 Brian Robbins – mix engineering
 Zakk Cervini – engineering (tracks 5, 6, 12)

Charts

References

2016 albums
Beartooth (band) albums
Red Bull Records albums